The 2011 AFC Asian Cup qualification saw various countries take part to determine 10 spots to the final tournament in Qatar under the new qualification system set by the Asian Football Confederation (AFC).

Six other teams also qualified for the finals, even though they did not take part in the qualifiers:
 The host nation: Qatar;
 The top three finishers in the 2007 tournament: Iraq, Saudi Arabia and Korea Republic;
 The winner of the 2008 AFC Challenge Cup: India;
 The winner of the 2010 AFC Challenge Cup: Korea DPR.

Qualified teams

Notes:
1 Bold indicates champion for that year
2 Italic indicates host

Seedings
On 6 December 2007 the Asian Football Confederation announced the seeding for the preliminary round of the 2011 tournament:

 Teams marked '*' withdrew prior to the draw. All of them participated in the 2008 and 2010 AFC Challenge Cup, and therefore had a chance to qualify via those two tournaments.
 India (marked '**') were drawn into Group C of the qualifiers, but withdrew from the qualifiers following their victory in the 2008 AFC Challenge Cup which automatically qualified them for the final tournament.
 Maldives (marked '***') were the only other team that entered the Asian Cup qualifiers who could also qualify via the 2010 AFC Challenge Cup, but they were eliminated from the Asian Cup qualifiers before the group stage.
 The following teams did not enter main qualification, but could qualify via the AFC Challenge Cups if they chose to enter:

Preliminary round
The preliminary round reduced the number of non-automatic qualifiers to 20. Following the withdrawals of Korea DPR, Myanmar and Turkmenistan, only two teams were involved. The two lowest ranked AFC teams, Lebanon and Maldives, played home-and-away matches in April 2008. The away goals rule would be applied, and extra time and penalty shootout would be used to decide the winner if necessary. The winner of the preliminary round advanced to the qualifying round, where it was joined by the 19 teams seeded 4th to 22nd.

|}

Lebanon won 6–1 on aggregate and advanced to the group stage.

Qualifying round
The 20 teams were divided into five groups of four. Teams played each other home and way in a round-robin format. The top two in each group advanced to the 2011 tournament where they were joined by the other qualifiers — Qatar, Iraq, Saudi Arabia, South Korea, India and North Korea.

Seedings
The following teams were drawn at this round:

Tiebreakers
The teams are ranked according to points (3 points for a win, 1 point for a tie, 0 points for a loss) and tie breakers are in following order:
 Greater number of points obtained in the group matches between the teams concerned;
 Goal difference resulting from the group matches between the teams concerned;
 Greater number of goals scored in the group matches between the teams concerned;
 Goal difference in all the group matches;
 Greater number of goals scored in all the group matches;
 Kicks from the penalty mark if only two teams are involved and they are both on the field of play;
 Drawing of lots.

Group A

Group B

Group C

Following their victory in the 2008 AFC Challenge Cup, India was given a bye to the final tournament and removed from this group prior to the first match.  They were not replaced.

Group D

Group E

Goalscorers
6 goals
  Shinji Okazaki

5 goals
  Ismael Abdullatif

3 goals

  Gao Lin
  Sōta Hirayama
  Noh Alam Shah

2 goals

  Luke Wilkshire
  Salman Isa
  Abdulla Baba Fatadi
  Qu Bo
  Du Wei
  Mohammad Nouri
  Gholamreza Rezaei
  Javad Nekounam
  Bader Al-Mutawa
  Mahmoud El Ali
  Maher Al Sayed
  Firas Al Khatib
  Jehad Al Hussein
  Sutee Suksomkit
  Mohamed Omer
  Ismail Matar
  Ahmad Khalil
  Alexander Geynrikh
  Nguyễn Vũ Phong
  Lê Công Vinh
  Zaher Farid Al-Fadhli
  Ali Al Nono

1 goal

  Tim Cahill
  Dean Heffernan
  Brett Emerton
  Mark Milligan
  Hussain Salman
  Sayed Mohamed Adnan
  Hao Junmin
  Jiang Ning
  Liu Jian
  Yu Hai
  Yang Xu
  Zhang Linpeng
  Cheng Siu Wai
  Bambang Pamungkas
  Boaz Solossa
  Budi Sudarsono
  Majid Gholamnejad
  Karim Bagheri
  Maziar Zare
  Hadi Aghili
  Mehrzad Madanchi
  Yuji Nakazawa
  Marcus Túlio Tanaka
  Yuto Nagatomo
  Tatsuya Tanaka
  Makoto Hasebe
  Shunsuke Nakamura
  Hisato Satō
  Keisuke Honda
  Hatem Aqel
  Amer Deeb
  Odai Al-Saify
  Anas Bani Yaseen
  Musaed Neda
  Ahmad Ajab
  Fayez Bandar
  Yousef Nasser
  Nasrat Al Jamal
  Akram Moghrabi
  Ali Yaacoub
  Abbas Ahmed Atwi
  Mohammed Ghaddar
  Mohamad Korhani
  Mohd Zaquan Adha
  Baddrol Bakhtiar
  Shamweel Qasim
  Khalifa Ayil
  Hassan Rabia
  Fawzi Bashir
  Ismail Sulaiman
  Agu Casmir
  Mustafic Fahrudin
  Aleksandar Đurić
  Abdelrazaq Al Hussain
  Raja Rafe
  Mohamed Al Zeno
  Abdul Fattah Al Agha
  Therdsak Chaiman
  Sultan Bargash
  Farhod Tadjiyev
  Server Djeparov
  Anvar Gafurov
  Bahodir Nasimov
  Timur Kapadze
  Nguyễn Minh Phương
  Phạm Thành Lương
  Sami Abbod
  Akram Al Selwi
  Mohammed Al Abidi

Own goal
  Aref Thabit Al-Dali (1) (playing against Bahrain)

References

External links
 Schedule & Results

Q
AFC Asian Cup qualification
Qual
Qual